Plaza de toros de Salamanca – La Glorieta, nicknamed La Glorieta or Plaza de Toros de La Glorieta, is a bullring at Avenida San Agustín, 1, Salamanca, Castile and León, Spain. It is currently used for bull fighting. The stadium holds 10,858 people. It was built in 1892 and officially opened on September 11, 1893. It is classical in style and has three levels made of stone, wrought-iron and brick.

Glorieta
Sports venues in Castile and León
1893 establishments in Spain
Sports venues completed in 1893